The following highways are numbered 780:

Australia
  Western Port Highway

Canada
 Saskatchewan Highway 780

United States
  Interstate 780
  Florida State Road 780
  Nevada State Route 780 (former)
  Ohio State Route 780 (former)
  Pennsylvania Route 780 (former)
  Pennsylvania Route 780 (current)
  Puerto Rico Highway 780
  Virginia State Route 780